Eupterote celebica is a moth in the family Eupterotidae. It was described by Wolfgang A. Nässig, Jeremy Daniel Holloway and Martin Beeke in 2011. It is found in Sulawesi, Indonesia.

The length of the forewings is 37–40 mm for males and 51 mm for females.

References

Moths described in 2011
Eupterotinae